The Pawcatuck River is a river in the US states of Rhode Island and Connecticut flowing approximately . There are eight dams along the river's length.  was named after the river.

History
The river was specified as the western boundary of the Colony of Rhode Island and Providence Plantations in the original charter of 1636. It was formerly called the Charles River between its source and the mouth of the Wood River near Bradford, Rhode Island.

On April 20, 2006, an Atlantic white-sided dolphin swam several miles up the river to Westerly, Rhode Island from Little Narragansett Bay at the east end of Fishers Island Sound. It spent several hours at Westerly-Pawcatuck, near the bridge connecting Rhode Island and Connecticut, while several hundred spectators gathered to see it. According to the Mystic Aquarium, the dolphin may have become separated from its pod at sea and had been searching for it. It was captured and taken later that night to the aquarium, where it died; it had become sick, underweight, and bruised during its journey upriver.

The Pawcatuck River flooded during a fierce rainstorm in New England on March 29, 2010, with waters overflowing into both Westerly and Pawcatuck. Both towns evacuated low-lying areas, and some historic buildings were lost to flood damage along the course of the river, and its tributaries such as a 150-year-old general store in North Stonington adjacent to the Shunock River. The bridge in downtown Westerly-Pawcatuck was closed for several weeks until the river had gone down enough for divers to inspect it for safety.

Course
The Pawcatuck River's source is Worden Pond in South Kingstown, Rhode Island. It proceeds generally west and southwest through the villages of Kenyon, Carolina, and Bradford, Rhode Island. It serves as the border between the towns of Charlestown and Richmond, Rhode Island, Charlestown and Hopkinton, Rhode Island, and Hopkinton and Westerly. It turns briefly northwest and west before resuming a southward course to flow past Potter Hill, Rhode Island and between the towns of Westerly, Rhode Island and the Pawcatuck section of Stonington, Connecticut; its mouth is on Little Narragansett Bay on Long Island Sound.

Crossings
Below is a list of all crossings over the Pawcatuck River. The list starts at the headwaters and goes downstream.
 Charlestown
 Biscuit City Road
 South County Trail (RI 2)
 Sherman Avenue
 Northeast Corridor (Amtrak)
 Shannock Road
 Northeast Corridor (Amtrak)
 Old Shannock Road
 Northeast Corridor (Amtrak)
 Carolina Back Road (RI 112)
 Alton Carolina Road (RI 91)
 Northeast Corridor (Amtrak)
 Kings Factory Road
 Northeast Corridor (Amtrak)
 Burdickville Road
 Northeast Corridor (Amtrak)
 Westerly
 Northeast Corridor (Amtrak)
 Alton Bradford Road (RI 91/216)
 Ashaway Road (RI 3)
 Potter Hill Road
 Boombridge Road
 Bridge Road
 Westerly Bypass (RI 78)
 Stillman Avenue
 Northeast Corridor (Amtrak)
 Broad Street (U.S. 1)

Tributaries
In addition to many unnamed tributaries, the following brooks and rivers feed the Pawcatuck:
 Usquepaug River
 Pusquiset Brook
 Beaver River
 Taney Brook
 White Brook
 Meadow Brook
 Wood River
 Poquiani Brook
 Tomaquag Brook
 McGowan Brook
 Aguntaug Brook
 Ashaway River
 Shunock River
 Mastuxet Brook

See also
 List of rivers in Rhode Island
 List of rivers in Connecticut

References

Rivers of New London County, Connecticut
Rivers of Washington County, Rhode Island
Connecticut placenames of Native American origin
Rhode Island placenames of Native American origin
Long Island Sound
Borders of Rhode Island
Borders of Connecticut
Estuaries of Connecticut
Estuaries of Rhode Island
Charlestown, Rhode Island
Westerly, Rhode Island
South Kingstown, Rhode Island
Rivers of Connecticut
Rivers of Rhode Island
Wild and Scenic Rivers of the United States